Ailhon is a commune in the Ardèche department in the Auvergne-Rhône-Alpes region of  southern France.

The inhabitants of the commune are known as Ailhonnais or Ailhonnaises

Geography

Location
Located at an altitude of 406 metres, Ailhon is a commune in the canton of Aubenas-2 and the arrondissement of Largentière, some 5 km south-west of Aubenas. It can be accessed by the D223 road from Prades in the north, a tortuous mountain road which continues south through the commune, without passing near the village, to join the D103. Access to the village is by the D235 from Aubenas in the north-east to the hamlet of La Charberterie in the north of the commune then the D359 south to the village continuing south to Merzelet. The commune is characterised by a large area with mountainous terrain heavily forested with a network of small mountain roads and many scattered hamlets.

Numerous streams cover the commune with the Ruisseau du Gary rising in the north and flowing the length of the commune gathering many tributaries south-west to join La Lanche which forms the south-western border of the commune. There is also the Auzon which rises just north of the commune and forms the eastern border gathering many tributaries and continues south to join the Ardeche near Saint-Sernin. The Ruisseau d'Ailhon flows through the village east to join the Auzon.

Neighbouring communes and villages

History
A prehistoric tomb at Gay and many vestiges at Daus attest to human presence since antiquity.

It was in 1298 when the name of the noble family of Ailhon (Ailhou in patois and Alho in Latin) appeared for the first time when Pierre d'Ailhon sold a nearby fortified house to the house of Mirabel.

During the Wars of Religion, particularly from 1586 to 1591, the village paid a heavy price: the fort was taken and retaken and nothing remains except a tower in the Chabert house south of the village.

In 1670, Ailhon participated in the Roure Revolt, a rebellion caused by a disastrous harvest followed by a rumour of an increase in taxes. The insurgents armed only with scythes and sticks were massacred by the king's armies on the plain of Lavilledieu. The leader of the revolt, Anthoine du Roure, was arrested in Saint-Jean-Pied-de-Port and broken on the wheel in Montpellier on 29 October 1670. His body was then exposed on the high road from Montpellier to Nimes and his head placed on top of the Porte Saint-Antoine in Aubenas. A square Jacques Roure was dedicated to his memory in Aubenas (on the proposal of Councillor Durand in 1896). Another square (Anthoine du Roure) also bears his name in Lachapelle-sous-Aubenas.<ref>L. Gout, J. Roux, J. Volane, History of the Ardèche, E. Tourrette, Aubenas, 1908 </ref>

The disorder during the French Revolution resulted in a band of brigands led by Fourniquet de Chassiers (executed at Saint-Cirgues-de-Prades in May 1800) scouring the territory.

Administration

List of Successive Mayors of Ailhon

Mayors from 1977

Population

Distribution of Age Groups
Percentage Distribution of Age Groups in Ailhon and Ardèche Department in 2017

Source: INSEEÉvolution et structure de la population en 2017: Département de l'Ardèche (07)

Sites and Monuments
Daus (a Celtic tumulus): prehistoric site
The Church of Saint André (13th century) is registered as an historical monument. The church was enlarged and revised until the beginning of the 16th century and it houses many sculptures. There is a huge trunk of an Elm tree planted in 1593 - as in many parishes - by order of Maximilien de Béthune, Duke of Sully, to celebrate the conversion to the Catholic religion of Henry IV. Two items in the church are registered as historical objects:
A Sarcophagus cover (15th century)
A Stoup (18th century)

Picture Gallery

Panoramic views

See also
Communes of the Ardèche department
Cantons of the Ardèche department
Arrondissements of the Ardèche department

Bibliography
Charles Albin Mazon (1828-1908), A Historical Account of the Ancient Parish of Ailhon'', Privas, imprimerie centrale, 1905

References

External links
Ailhon official website 
Ailhon on the old National Geographic Institute website 
Ailhon on Géoportail, National Geographic Institute (IGN) website 
Ailhon on the 1750 Cassini Map

Communes of Ardèche